Dropmire  is a surveillance program by the United States' National Security Agency (NSA) aimed at surveillance of foreign embassies and diplomatic staff, including those of NATO allies. The program's existence was revealed in June 2013 by whistleblower Edward Snowden in The Guardian newspaper. The report reveals that at least 38 foreign embassies were under surveillance, some of them as far back as 2007.

Earlier in June 2013, The Guardian had reported that the NSA spied on diplomats during the 2009 G-20 London Summit, but no precise program name was revealed at the time.

Diplomatic spying by the United States had been revealed as far back as 2010, when it was revealed that US agencies had spied on the Secretary-General of the United Nations, Ban Ki-moon – at the time, it was not known that this had been done as part of a systematic program.

See also
Crypto AG
Global surveillance disclosures (1970–2013)
Global surveillance disclosures (2013–present)
Spying on United Nations leaders by United States diplomats
Room 641A
Tempora

References

2013 scandals
American secret government programs
Counterterrorism in the United States
Espionage
Human rights
Intelligence agency programmes revealed by Edward Snowden
Mass surveillance
Obama administration controversies
National Security Agency operations
Privacy of telecommunications
Privacy in the United States
Surveillance
Surveillance scandals
United States national security policy
War on terror